Aberavon (Welsh: Aberafan) is a constituency represented in the House of Commons of the Parliament of the United Kingdom since 2015 by Stephen Kinnock of the Welsh Labour Party. It includes the town of Aberavon, although the largest town in the constituency is Port Talbot.

History
The constituency was created for the 1918 general election by the dividing of the Swansea District. With the exception of the first term, it has always been held by the Labour Party. Ramsay MacDonald, who became Labour's first Prime Minister in 1924, held the seat from 1922 to 1929. Its current MP, Stephen Kinnock, is the son of Neil Kinnock, who was Labour leader and Leader of the Opposition from 1983 to 1992.

It is one of the most consistently safe seats for Labour; since the end of the Second World War, the Labour candidate has always won Aberavon with a majority at least 33%, and with the exception of 2015, the Labour candidate has also always won an overall majority of the vote in the seat. In 2015, Kinnock only won 48.9% of the vote in Aberavon, against a surge in the vote for the UKIP candidate; however, in 2017, Kinnock's vote share rose by 19.2 percentage points, the biggest increase in the Labour vote in the seat's history, and his majority increased to 50.4%, the highest for an Aberavon MP since 2001. The 2017 result also made Aberavon the safest Labour seat in Wales, however the seat saw a significant swing against Labour in 2019.

Boundaries

1918–1950: The Borough of Aberavon, the Urban Districts of Briton Ferry, Glencorwg, Margam, and Porthcawl, and part of the Rural Districts of Neath and Penybont.

1950–1983: The Borough of Port Talbot, the Urban Districts of Glyncorrwg and Porthcawl, and part of the Rural District of Penybont.

1983–1997: The Borough of Afan, and the Borough of Neath wards nos. 3 and 6.

1997–2010: The Borough of Port Talbot, and the Borough of Neath wards of Briton Ferry East, Briton Ferry West, Coedffranc Central, Coedffranc North and Coedffranc West.

2010–present: The Neath Port Talbot County Borough electoral divisions of Aberavon, Baglan, Briton Ferry East, Briton Ferry West, Bryn and Cwmavon, Coedffranc Central, Coedffranc North, Coedffranc West, Cymmer, Glyncorrwg, Gwynfi, Margam, Port Talbot, Sandfields East, Sandfields West, and Tai-bach.

The constituency is in South Wales, situated on the right bank of the River Afan, near its mouth in Swansea Bay.

Commenting on the 1983 boundary changes to the constituency when moving the 2000 Loyal Address of the Blair Government in Parliament, the seat's then-MP Sir John Morris, who would retire at the next general election, said:

Members of Parliament

Elections

Elections in the 1910s

Jones withdrew in favour of Edwards on 13 December 1918.

Elections in the 1920s

Elections in the 1930s

Elections in the 1940s

Elections in the 1950s

Elections in the 1960s

Elections in the 1970s

Elections in the 1980s

Elections in the 1990s

Elections in the 2000s

Elections in the 2010s

Of the 44 rejected ballots:
29 were either unmarked or it was uncertain who the vote was for.
14 voted for more than one candidate.
1 had writing or mark by which the voter could be identified.

Of the 57 rejected ballots:
37 were either unmarked or it was uncertain who the vote was for.
20 voted for more than one candidate.

Of the 57 rejected ballots:
41 were either unmarked or it was uncertain who the vote was for.
16 voted for more than one candidate.

Of the 82 rejected ballots:
61 were either unmarked or it was uncertain who the vote was for.
19 voted for more than one candidate.
2 had writing or mark by which the voter could be identified.

See also
 Aberavon (Senedd constituency)
 List of parliamentary constituencies in West Glamorgan
 List of parliamentary constituencies in Wales

References

External links
Politics Resources (election results from 1922 onwards)
Electoral Calculus (election results from 1955 onwards)
2017 Election House Of Commons Library 2017 Election report
A Vision Of Britain Through Time (constituency elector numbers)

Further reading

Parliamentary constituencies in South Wales
Politics of Neath Port Talbot
Constituencies of the Parliament of the United Kingdom established in 1918
Constituencies of the Parliament of the United Kingdom represented by a sitting Prime Minister